Coleophora polonicella is a moth of the family Coleophoridae. It is found in Lithuania, Poland and Romania.

The wingspan is 9–10 mm. Adults are on wing in June and July.

The larvae feed on Astragalus arenarius. They create a greyish, laterally strongly compressed sheath case. The last part is bent downwards. The case has about twenty indistinct ridges. The mouth angle is about 20°. Larvae can be found from autumn to July.

References

polonicella
Moths of Europe
Moths described in 1865